Le Sapiche is a defunct restaurant in Gulpen, in the Netherlands. It was a fine dining restaurant that was awarded one Michelin star in 2000 and retained that rating until 2005.

Owner and head chef of Le Sapiche was Sascha Cremers.

The restaurant closed down in 2005 when Cremers sold the restaurant.

See also
List of Michelin starred restaurants in the Netherlands

References 

Restaurants in the Netherlands
Michelin Guide starred restaurants in the Netherlands
Defunct restaurants in the Netherlands
Le Sapiche
Le Sapiche